Madeline Ella Searl (born 10 February 1994) is an Australian soccer player, who played for Newcastle Jets in the Australian W-League.

Club career
Searl played for Lake Macquarie. She joined Newcastle Jets and helped at an NNSW school soccer gala together with Ben Kennedy, Ben Kantarovski, and Tara Andrews. In December 2013, Searl suffered an anterior cruciate ligament injury, which followed previous problems of chronic fatigue, two broken ankles and a hamstring injury.

International career
In November 2008, Searl was called up to Australia's U-16 national team for the 2009 AFC U-16 Women's Championship qualification tournament. She scored twice in the campaign, once in a 17–0 victory over Singapore and once in a 20–0 victory over Philippines. A year later, she was selected for the 23-person squad for the tournament itself.

References

External links
 Profile at Newcastle Jets (archived)

1994 births
Living people
Australian women's soccer players
Newcastle Jets FC (A-League Women) players
Women's association football midfielders